Mehedinți County is a county of Romania on the border with Serbia and Bulgaria. It is mostly located in the historical province of Oltenia, with one municipality (Orșova) and three communes (Dubova, Eșelnița, and Svinița) located in the Banat. The county seat is Drobeta-Turnu Severin.

Name 
The Romanian form originates from the first one, and a third originates from the Romanian: . The territory was famous for its apiaries, that's why it was named from the Hungarian  word meaning bee.

Demographics 

In 2011, it had a population of 254,570 and the population density was 51.6/km2.

 Romanians - 96.1%
 Roma - 3%
 Others (including Serbs, Hungarians, and Germans) - 0.9%

Geography 

This county has a total area of 4,933 km2.

In the North-West there are the Mehedinți Mountains with heights up to 1500 m, part of the Western end of the Southern Carpathians.

The heights decrease towards the East, passing through the hills to a high plain - the Western end of the Romanian Plain.

In the South the Danube flows, forming a wide valley, with channels and ponds.  Another important river is the Motru River in the East side, an affluent of the Jiu River.  Also, in the West side there is the Cerna River forming a passage between the Oltenia region and the Banat region.

Neighbours 

 Bulgaria in the South - Vidin Province.
 Serbia in the West and South-West - Bor District.
 Caraș-Severin County in the North-West.
 Gorj County in the North-East.
 Dolj County in the South-East.

Economy 
The energetic sector is highly developed in the county, on the Danube being two big hydro electrical power plants (Iron Gates I and Iron Gates II). Also in NE of Drobeta-Turnu Severin there is a heavy water complex (Romag Prod).

The predominant industries in the county are:
 Chemical industry.
 Food and beverages industry.
 Textile industry.
 Mechanical components industry.
 Railway and ship equipment industry.
 Wood and paper industry.

In the North, coal and copper are extracted.

The South is mainly agricultural, suited for growing cereals on large surfaces.  Also vegetables are cultivated and there are important surfaces of wines and fruit orchards.

Tourism 

The main tourist destinations are:
 The city of Drobeta-Turnu Severin - the ruins of Trajan's first bridge over the Danube
 The city of Orșova.
 The Mehedinți Mountains.
 The Danube's Iron Gates.
 Baia de Aramă Monastery

Politics 

The Mehedinți County Council, renewed at the 2020 local elections, consists of 30 counsellors, with the following party composition:

Administrative divisions

Mehedinți County has 2 municipalities, 3 towns and 61 communes
Municipalities
Drobeta-Turnu Severin - capital city; population: 86,475 (as of 2011)
Orșova
Towns
Baia de Aramă
Strehaia
Vânju Mare

Communes
Bâcleș
Bala
Bălăcița
Balta
Bâlvănești
Braniștea
Breznița-Motru
Breznița-Ocol
Broșteni
Burila Mare
Butoiești
Căzănești
Cireșu
Corcova
Corlățel
Cujmir
Dârvari
Devesel
Dubova
Dumbrava
Eșelnița
Florești
Gârla Mare
Godeanu
Gogoșu
Greci
Grozești
Gruia
Hinova
Husnicioara
Ilovăț
Ilovița
Isverna
Izvoru Bârzii
Jiana
Livezile
Malovăț
Obârșia de Câmp
Obârșia-Cloșani
Oprișor
Pădina Mare
Pătulele
Podeni
Ponoarele
Poroina Mare
Pristol
Prunișor
Punghina
Rogova
Salcia
Șișești
Șimian
Șovarna
Stângăceaua
Svinița
Tâmna
Vânători
Vânjuleț
Vlădaia
Voloiac
Vrata

Historical county

Historically, the county was located in the southwestern part of Greater Romania, in the western part of the historical region of Oltenia. Its capital was Târgu Jiu. The interwar county territory comprised a large part of the current Mehedinți County. At present, its territory comprises a large part of the current territory of Mehedinţi County except for the northern part belonging to Gorj County, while a small part of the former Severin County where Orsova was located is currently part of Mehedinti County.

It was bordered on the west by the Kingdom of Yugoslavia, in the northwest by Severin County, to the north by Hunedoara County, to the east by the counties of Gorj and Dolj, and in the south by the Kingdom of Bulgaria.

Administration

The county was originally divided into four administrative districts (plăși):

Plasa Câmpul
Plasa Cloșani, headquartered at Cloșani
Plasa Motru, headquartered at Motru
Plasa Ocolul, headquartered at Turnu Severin

Subsequently, Plasa Câmpul was disbanded and replaced with five more districts:
Plasa Bâcleș, headquartered at Bâcleș
Plasa Broșteni, headquartered at Broșteni
Plasa Cujmir, headquartered at Cujmiru
Plasa Devesel, headquartered at Devesel
Plasa Vânju Mare, headquartered at Vânju Mare

Population 
According to the 1930 census data, the county population was 303,878 inhabitants, ethnically divided as follows: 98.7% Romanians, 1.2% Romanis, as well as other minorities. From the religious point of view, the population was 99.0% Eastern Orthodox, 0.5% Roman Catholic, 0.2% Jewish, as well as other minorities.

Urban population 
In 1930, the county's urban population comprised 91.3% Romanians, 2.5% Germans, 1.3% Romanies, 1.3% Jews, 1.1% Serbs and Croats, as well as other minorities. From the religious point of view, the urban population was composed of 92.9% Eastern Orthodox, 4.3% Roman Catholic, 1.5% Jewish, 0.4% Greek Catholic, 0.4% Lutheran, as well as other minorities.

References

External links

 
Counties of Romania
1879 establishments in Romania
1938 disestablishments in Romania
1940 establishments in Romania
1950 disestablishments in Romania
1968 establishments in Romania
States and territories established in 1879
States and territories disestablished in 1938
States and territories established in 1940
States and territories disestablished in 1950
States and territories established in 1968